Élizabeth Martichoux (born 1961) is a French radio political journalist.

Early life
Élizabeth Martichoux was born in 1961 in Seine-et-Marne. She graduated from the École supérieure de journalisme in Lille.

Career
Martichoux began her career as a radio journalist for France Inter in 1984. She worked Europe 1 from 1991 to 2006, when she joined RTL in 2001. She became RTL's political director in 2013. In September 2016, she succeeded Olivier Mazerolle as the political interviewer of the 7:50AM programme. During the 2017 French presidential campaign, she presented one of the primary debates for The Republicans.

Martichoux is the author of two books.

Personal life
With her former husband, Socialist political advisor Aquilino Morelle, she has four children.

Works

References

1961 births
Living people
People from Seine-et-Marne
French radio journalists
French television journalists
French political journalists
French women radio journalists
French women television journalists